Heremites auratus, the Levant skink, golden grass mabuya, or golden grass skink, is a species of skink. It is found in Greece and Turkey, and possibly much more widely in Asia and even north-eastern Africa.

References

Heremites
Lizards of Europe
Reptiles of Turkey
Reptiles described in 1758
Taxa named by Carl Linnaeus